Peril at End House may refer to:
 Peril at End House, Agatha Christie novel
 Peril at End House (play), Arnold Ridley play
 Peril at End House (film, 1989), Soviet film by Vadim Derbenyov
 Peril at End House (film, 1990), British film by Renny Rye
 Agatha Christie: Peril at End House, videogame